Rushanara Ali  (born 14 March 1975) is a British Labour Party politician serving as the Member of Parliament (MP) for Bethnal Green and Bow since 2010. Ali was the first British Bangladeshi elected to serve in the British Parliament.

She served as a Shadow Minister for International Development from 2010 to 2013, and the Shadow Minister for Further Education from 2013 to 2014. In September 2014, Ali resigned from the opposition front bench to abstain on a motion permitting military action in Iraq.

Early life
Ali was born in Bishwanath, Sylhet, Bangladesh. With her family, Ali emigrated to the East End of London at the age of seven, where she attended Mulberry School for Girls and Tower Hamlets College.  She grew up in Tower Hamlets where her father was a manual labourer. The first in her family to go to university, Ali studied Philosophy, Politics and Economics at St John's College, Oxford.

Early career
Ali began her career as a research assistant to Michael Young, working on a project which paved the way for the establishment of Tower Hamlets Summer University, offering independent learning programmes for young people aged 11–25. She helped to develop "Language Line", a national telephone interpreting service in over 100 languages. Between 1997 and 1999 she was parliamentary assistant to Oona King, MP for Bethnal Green and Bow.

Ali worked on human rights issues at the Foreign Office from 2000 to 2001.  Prior to this, she was a research fellow at the Institute of Public Policy Research (IPPR) focussing on anti-discrimination issues from 1999 to 2002. From 2002 to 2005, she worked in the community cohesion unit at the Communities Directorate of the Home Office, leading a work programme to mobilise local and national agencies in the aftermath of the 2001 riots in Burnley, Bradford and Oldham, to prevent further conflict and unrest, challenging central Government to provide appropriate support to these areas.

Previously, Ali worked as Associate Director of the Young Foundation in Bethnal Green, a thinktank focused on social innovation. She has also served as Chair of Tower Hamlets Summer University; a commissioner on the London Child Poverty Commission; board member of Tower Hamlets College; Trustee of the Paul Hamlyn Foundation; and member of the Tate Britain Council.

Ali has published articles on a variety of political issues in numerous national and local media including The Guardian, Prospect magazine and Progress magazine. Ali has also appeared on Question Time Extra, BBC Radio 4's Woman's Hour and Thinking Allowed.

In March 2009, Ali was listed by The Guardian as one of the most powerful Muslim women in Britain.

Parliamentary career

In April 2007, Ali was chosen as the Labour Party's prospective Parliamentary candidate for Bethnal Green and Bow. In May 2010, she was elected as a Member of Parliament with a majority of 11,574 votes. She is the first person of Bangladeshi origin to have been elected to the House of Commons, and along with Shabana Mahmood and Yasmin Qureshi, became one of the United Kingdom's first female Muslim MPs.

In February 2013, Ali voted in favour of the Same Sex Marriage Bill. This drew support from pro-LGBT activists such as Peter Tatchell, but condemnation from religious figures such as the Imams of mosques in Tooting and Bradford. She would later defend a constituent who alleged he was a victim of homophobic hate crime after his neighbours sang songs at him with the words "queer", "fairy" and "fag", calling for the case to be reconsidered in a letter to the Crown Prosecution Service.

In April 2013, Ali was appointed a Governor of the UK government funded Westminster Foundation for Democracy.

Ali served as Shadow Minister of State for International Development from October 2010 to October 2013. In the October 2013 Labour frontbench reshuffle, Ali was appointed Shadow Minister of State for Education.

On 26 September 2014, she resigned from the Shadow Education team to abstain on the Coalition government's House of Commons motion permitting military action against Islamic State of Iraq and the Levant in Iraq. In a letter to the leader of the party Ed Miliband, she wrote "I appreciate the sincerity of members of parliament from all sides of the House who today support military action against ISIL. I know that British Muslims stand united in the total condemnation of the murders that ISIL have committed. However, there is a genuine belief in Muslim and non-Muslim communities that military action will only create further bloodshed and further pain for the people of Iraq."

Ali also told Miliband that she remained totally committed to his leadership and was looking forward to his becoming the prime minister in next eight months' time. In his return letter to Ali, Miliband praised her as 'someone with great ability and talent'. Regretting her departure from the frontbench team, the Labour leader added that he accepted the resignation with due respect to her decision.

Ali retained her seat at the 2015 general election, doubling her majority to 24,317 and earning a 61% share of the vote. In June 2015, she was one of 36 Labour MPs to nominate Jeremy Corbyn as a candidate in the Labour leadership election.

During the 2010-2015 parliament, Ali claimed a total of £674,982 in expenses.

In April 2016, British Prime Minister David Cameron appointed Ali as the Prime Ministerial Trade Envoy to Bangladesh, as part of cross-party trade envoy network. She supported Owen Smith in the failed attempt to replace Jeremy Corbyn in the 2016 leadership Election, calling on Corbyn to "do the decent thing" and quit as Labour leader.

Ali campaigned to remain in the European Union in the 2016 membership referendum and in 2017 voted against the triggering of Article 50.

In June 2017, in the general election, Ali retained her seat with an increased majority of 35,393.

In March 2018, Ali received a suspicious package containing an anti-Islamic letter and sticky liquid. The substance was later found to be harmless. Similar packages were received by fellow Labour MPs Mohammad Yasin, Rupa Huq and Afzal Khan.

In October 2018, Ali signed the 'MPs not border guards' pledge, committing to not report constituents to the Home Office for immigration enforcement.

As of 2019, Ali is part of the executive committee of the British-American Project. In December 2019, in the general election, Ali retained her seat with an increased majority of 37,524.

In early 2020, Ali supported Keir Starmer in the 2020 Labour Party leadership election.

In March 2020, Ali was one of 76 Labour MPs to urge that the government grant recourse to public funds for all migrants in the UK regardless of their legal status.

In March 2020 during the COVID-19 pandemic, she defended the closure of Victoria Park in her constituency.

In March 2021, a 42-year-old man was sentenced after orchestrating an 18-month hate campaign against Ali which included death threats.

See also
 List of British Bangladeshis
 List of ethnic minority politicians in the United Kingdom

References

External links

 
 Tower Hamlets Labour Party
 
 Rushanara Ali on New Statesman
 সিলেটের মেয়ে রুশনারা বিপুল ভোটে পুনর্নির্বাচিত
 

1975 births
Living people
Alumni of St John's College, Oxford
Alumni of Tower Hamlets College
Bangladeshi emigrants to England
British people of Bangladeshi descent
Bangladeshi Muslims
British Muslims
British politicians of Bangladeshi descent
Female members of the Parliament of the United Kingdom for English constituencies
Labour Party (UK) MPs for English constituencies
21st-century British women politicians
Naturalised citizens of the United Kingdom
People associated with the Tate galleries
People educated at Mulberry School for Girls
People from Bishwanath Upazila
People from the London Borough of Tower Hamlets
The Guardian people
UK MPs 2010–2015
UK MPs 2015–2017
UK MPs 2017–2019
UK MPs 2019–present
21st-century English women
21st-century English people
21st-century Bangladeshi women politicians